Bear Pond may refer to:

Bodies of water
 Bear Pond (Arkansas), a lake in Arkansas County, Arkansas
 Bear Pond (Hancock County, Maine)
 Bear Pond (Beaver River, New York), in Herkimer County
 Bear Pond (Stillwater, New York), in Herkimer County
 A lake in Bayfield County, Wisconsin)
 Bear Pond (Kenora District), a lake in Ontario
 Bear Pond (Lennox and Addington County), a lake in Ontario

Other uses
 Bear Pond (book), a 1990 book by Bruce Weber
 Bear Pond Mountains, a subrange of the Appalachian Mountains